A Night of Serious Drinking is an allegorical novel, published 1938, by the French surrealist writer René Daumal. It has a plot based on the narrator imbibing alcohol copiously.

Plot summary
An unnamed narrator spends an evening getting drunk with a group of friends. As the party becomes intoxicated and exuberant, the narrator seemingly begins a journey that ranges from apparent paradises to hell. The fantastic world depicted in A Night of Serious Drinking is actually the ordinary world distorted and satirized. Various characters are termed Anthographers, Fabricators of useless objects, Scienters, Nibblists, Clarificators, and other absurd titles. Yet the inhabitants of these strange realms are only too familiar: scientists dissecting an animal in their laboratory, a wise man surrounded by his devotees, politicians, poets expounding their rhetoric. These characters perform humorous antics and intellectual games, which they consider to be attempts to find meaning.

In the second half of the book there is an early description of a linguistic strange loop (a set of verbal references which seem to repeat conceptually) which the character terms a "Taglufon."

1938 French novels
Allegory
Surrealist novels
Heaven and hell novels